In the mathematical discipline of graph theory, Petersen's theorem, named after Julius Petersen, is one of the earliest results in graph theory and can be stated as follows:

Petersen's Theorem. Every cubic, bridgeless graph contains a perfect matching.

In other words, if a graph has exactly three edges at each vertex, and every edge belongs to a cycle, then it has a set of edges that touches every vertex exactly once.

Proof 
Then by Tutte theorem  contains a perfect matching.

Let  be a component with an odd number of vertices in the graph induced by the vertex set . By a simple double counting argument we have that 

Since 

 

Moreover, since  is bridgeless we have that .

We get

which shows that the condition of Tutte theorem holds.

History 
The theorem is due to Julius Petersen, a Danish mathematician. It can be considered as one of the first results in graph theory. The theorem appears first in the 1891 article "Die Theorie der regulären graphs". By today's standards Petersen's proof of the theorem is complicated.

In modern textbooks Petersen's theorem is covered as an application of Tutte's theorem.

Applications 
 In a cubic graph with a perfect matching, the edges that are not in the perfect matching form a 2-factor. By orienting the 2-factor, the edges of the perfect matching can be extended to paths of length three, say by taking the outward-oriented edges. This shows that every cubic, bridgeless graph decomposes into edge-disjoint paths of length three.
 Petersen's theorem can also be applied to show that every maximal planar graph can be decomposed into a set of edge-disjoint paths of length three. In this case, the dual graph is cubic and bridgeless, so by Petersen's theorem it has a matching, which corresponds in the original graph to a pairing of adjacent triangle faces. Each pair of triangles gives a path of length three that includes the edge connecting the triangles together with two of the four remaining triangle edges.
 By applying Petersen's theorem to the dual graph of a triangle mesh and connecting pairs of triangles that are not matched, one can decompose the mesh into cyclic strips of triangles. With some further transformations it can be turned into a single strip, and hence gives a method for transforming a triangle mesh such that its dual graph becomes hamiltonian.

Extensions

Number of perfect matchings in cubic bridgeless graphs
It was conjectured by Lovász and Plummer that the number of perfect matchings contained in a cubic, bridgeless graph is exponential in the number of the vertices of the graph .

Algorithmic versions 
 discuss efficient versions of Petersen's theorem. Based on Frink's proof they obtain an  algorithm for computing a perfect matching in  a cubic, bridgeless graph with  vertices. If the graph is furthermore planar the same paper gives an  algorithm. Their  time bound can be improved based on subsequent improvements to the time for maintaining the set of bridges in a dynamic graph.

Higher degree
If G is a regular graph of degree d whose edge connectivity is at least d − 1, and G has an even number of vertices, then it has a perfect matching. More strongly, every edge of G belongs to at least one perfect matching. The condition on the number of vertices can be omitted from this result when the degree is odd, because in that case (by the handshaking lemma) the number of vertices is always even.

Notes

References

.

Matching (graph theory)
Theorems in graph theory